Aran John Hansen (born 18 December 1960) is a sailor from Papakura, New Zealand, who represented his country at the 1984 Summer Olympics in Los Angeles, United States as crew member in the Soling. With helmsman Tom Dodson and fellow crew member Simon Daubney they took the 11th place. Aran took also part in the 1988 Summer Olympics in Busan, South Korea. With same team they took the 7th place in the Soling.

References

Living people
1960 births
Sailors at the 1984 Summer Olympics – Soling
Sailors at the 1988 Summer Olympics – Soling
Olympic sailors of New Zealand
New Zealand male sailors (sport)